Leonardo "Leo" Inacio Nunes (born September 14, 1976 in Rio de Janeiro) is a Brazilian football player who last played for Miami FC in the USL First Division.

Career

Professional
Leo Inacio began his playing career in his native Brazil, playing for a string of Brazilian teams, including notables such as Flamengo, Vasco da Gama and Grêmio. He won the 1999 Campeonato Carioca with Flamengo.

After a brief stop in Belgium, where he played with FC Brussels, Leo Inacio signed with Miami FC during the 2008 USL First Division season.

References

1976 births
Living people
Brazilian footballers
Brazilian expatriate footballers
Campeonato Brasileiro Série A players
CR Flamengo footballers
Botafogo de Futebol e Regatas players
Fluminense FC players
CR Vasco da Gama players
Coritiba Foot Ball Club players
Villa Nova Atlético Clube players
Grêmio Foot-Ball Porto Alegrense players
Expatriate soccer players in the United States
Miami FC (2006) players
USL First Division players
Association football midfielders
Footballers from Rio de Janeiro (city)